Li Xuerui (born 24 January 1991) is a retired Chinese professional badminton player. She is one of the most successful players of her time. She was a gold medalist at 2012 London Olympics in the women's singles event and was the silver medalists in the 2013 and 2014 World Championships. Li Xuerui won fourteen Superseries titles, confirming her status as China's second most successful player after Wang Yihan. She reached a career high of no. 1 in the women's singles for 124 weeks. Li graduated with a BA from Huaqiao University.

Career summary 
Li Xuerui started playing badminton when she was 7 years old.  She began playing in local clubs in her hometown in Chongqing. She made her professional debut as a badminton player when she attended the Asia Junior championship which took place in Kuala Lumpur, Malaysia.

2008 
In 2008, she won a gold medal at the Asian Junior championship, which took place in Kuala Lumpur, Malaysia.

2010 
In 2010, Li Xuerui won her first Grand Prix Gold title at the Macau Open, in the final she defeated Adrianti Firdasari from Indonesia with a score of 21–18, 21–15.

Li won her first major tournament, the Asian Championships. In the final, she defeated her compatriot, Liu Xin, 21–13, 18–21, 21–19.

2012 
In 2012, she repeated her success at the Asian Championships by defeating Wang Yihan with a score of 21–16, 16–21, 21–9.

Li won the prestigious Super Series Premier event title at the All England Open for the first time by beating Wang Yihan in the final with a score of 21–13, 21–19.

She then captured other international titles in India Open, China Open, and Hong Kong Open.

She collected five Super Series titles, including the Super Series Final in Dubai which she won defeating Wang Shixian in the final.

The 2012 season could be said to be the career peak for Li Xuerui. She made her first appearance at the Olympic Games, and on August 5, she won the London Olympic gold medal, in the final she defeated compatriot Wang Yihan with a score of 21–15, 21–23, 21–17.

2013 
In 2013, she won a silver medal in the World Championship when she was defeated by Thailand's Ratchanok Intanon in the final with a score of 22–20, 18–21, 14–21.

In the same year, she won three Super Series titles in the Indonesia Open, China Open and the Super Series Final.

2014 
In 2014, she reached the World Championships final, then she lost to the Spanish player Carolina Marín with a score of 21–17, 17–21, 18–21.

Li managed to win four Super Series titles including successfully defending her title in Indonesia Open, the other titles were: Japan Open, Malaysia Open, and Denmark Open.

2015 
In 2015, Li Xuerui managed to defend her title at the Denmark Open.  In the final she defeated P. V. Sindhu of India with a score of 21-19, 21-12.

2016 Summer Olympics: heartbreak and injury issues 
At the 2016 Summer Olympics women's singles semi-finals, Li Xuerui was defeated by world No. 1 Carolina Marín when she suffered injuries to her anterior cruciate ligament (ACL) and lateral meniscus. This forced her to withdraw from the bronze medal match against Nozomi Okuhara.

2018: Return to professional badminton 
Li made her return to professional badminton at the 2017 National Games of China, where she played women's doubles but lost at the group stage. The reason she had played doubles instead of singles was that she was not yet fully recovered. In 2018, she made her return to international women's singles after a hiatus of 600 days at the 2018 Lingshui China Masters, which she won.

2019 
In 2019, she played 25 times with 11 wins and 14 losses. She reached the quarter final at the All England Open, but was stopped by the 2017 World Champion from Japan Nozomi Okuhara with a score of 17–21, 14–21. After that, she finished as the runner-up at the New Zealand Open, losing to South Korean youngster An Se-young with a score of 19–21, 15–21.
 
She lost to Busanan Ongbamrungphan 21-18, 20-22, 6-21 at the Australian Open despite leading in the second game. Afterwards, her career witnessed a huge downfall. She competed in Indonesia, Thailand, Japan and China and lost in the first round in all the tournaments. She announced her retirement from the international circuit in the first round match against Sayaka Takahashi in Korea Open on 17 October after trailing in the 2nd game 15-21, 3-11.

Achievements

Olympic Games 
Women's singles

World Championships 
Women's singles

Asian Games 
Women's singles

Asian Championships 
Women's singles

World University Championships 
Women's singles

Women's doubles

Asian Junior Championships 
Girls' singles

BWF World Tour 
The BWF World Tour, which was announced on 19 March 2017 and implemented in 2018, is a series of elite badminton tournaments sanctioned by the Badminton World Federation (BWF). The BWF World Tour is divided into levels of World Tour Finals, Super 1000, Super 750, Super 500, Super 300 (part of the HSBC World Tour), and the BWF Tour Super 100.

Women's singles

BWF Superseries 
The BWF Superseries, launched on 14 December 2006 and implemented in 2007, is a series of elite badminton tournaments, sanctioned by Badminton World Federation (BWF). BWF Superseries has two levels: Superseries and Superseries Premier. A season of Superseries features twelve tournaments around the world, which introduced since 2011, with successful players invited to the Superseries Finals held at the year end.

Women's singles

  BWF Superseries Finals tournament
  BWF Superseries Premier tournament
  BWF Superseries tournament

BWF Grand Prix 
The BWF Grand Prix has two levels, the BWF Grand Prix and Grand Prix Gold. It is a series of badminton tournaments sanctioned by the Badminton World Federation (BWF) since 2007.

Women's singles

  BWF Grand Prix Gold tournament
  BWF Grand Prix tournament

Performance timeline

Singles performance timeline

To avoid confusion and double counting, information in this table is updated only once a tournament or the player's participation in the tournament has concluded. This table is current through 2016 Indonesia Open.

Record against selected opponents 
Record against year-end Finals finalists, World Championships semi-finalists, and Olympic quarter-finalists.

References

External links 

 
 
 Li Xuerui at BadmintonLink.com
  Li Xue Rui at BadmintonCN.com

1991 births
Living people
Badminton players from Chongqing
Chinese female badminton players
Badminton players at the 2012 Summer Olympics
Badminton players at the 2016 Summer Olympics
Olympic badminton players of China
Olympic gold medalists for China
Olympic medalists in badminton
Medalists at the 2012 Summer Olympics
Badminton players at the 2014 Asian Games
Asian Games gold medalists for China
Asian Games silver medalists for China
Asian Games medalists in badminton
Medalists at the 2014 Asian Games
World No. 1 badminton players
BWF Best Female Player of the Year